Estée Lauder may refer to:

 Estée Lauder Companies, American multi-nation personal care corporation
 Estée Lauder (businesswoman), (1908–2004) American entrepreneur and namesake of the above corporation